Illinois Valley Airport  is a county-owned public-use airport located four miles (6.4 km) southwest of the central business district of Cave Junction, a city in Josephine County, Oregon, United States.

History
The Illinois Valley Airport, also known as the Siskiyou Smokejumper Base, or even the Cave Junction Airport, was built by the US Forest Service. It operated from 1943 to 1981 as a smokejumper base, during which time the smokejumpers parachuted on 1445 fires for 5390 fire jumps, or about 142 jumps per year. The Smokejumper Base is currently operating as the Siskiyou Smokejumper Base Museum and free tours of the museum are available daily from March 15 to November 15. Major building restoration projects and ground maintenance have been performed by community members and retired smokejumper volunteers over the course of several years.

Moon Trees
Lunar orbiter commander Stuart Roosa was a firefighter at the Siskiyou Smokejumper Base in 1954. In 1971, Roosa took a packet of Douglas Fir seeds with him to the moon, and when he returned the Forest Service planted these "Moon Trees" across the US, including two at the Illinois Valley Airport.  The smokejumpers cared for these trees, but after their departure, both trees died. The Moon Tree Run (10k) was held annually to honor Roosa's achievement when the site was operating as a fire base. The Moon Tree Run has only recently begun to be held once again thanks to volunteer efforts. The mixed terrain race is similar to the original race course and there is also a 5k race offered.

Facilities and aircraft 
For the 12-month period ending December 31, 2004, the airport had 6,000 aircraft operations, all of which were general aviation.

The airport has a fixed-base operator, aircraft rentals and instruction, hangar rentals, and a restaurant (closed) and a small campground. All other services are four miles (6 km) north in Cave Junction.

Note: as of January 2008 the FBO and restaurant are closed.

References

External links

Airports in Josephine County, Oregon
Airports established in 1943
National Register of Historic Places in Josephine County, Oregon
1943 establishments in Oregon
Historic districts on the National Register of Historic Places in Oregon
Transportation buildings and structures on the National Register of Historic Places in Oregon